The men's freestyle 84 kilograms is a competition featured at the 2010 World Wrestling Championships, and was held at the Olympic Stadium in Moscow, Russia on 11 September.

Results
Legend
C — Won by 3 cautions given to the opponent
F — Won by fall
WO — Won by walkover

Finals

Top half

Section 1

Section 2

Bottom half

Section 3

Section 4

Repechage

References
Results Book, Pages 94–95

Men's freestyle 84 kg